Sayed Mosaad (born on 8 April 1987) is an Egyptian footballer who last played for Al-Qanah, but was most famous for his spell at Zamalek in the Egyptian Premier League.

His transfer to El Zamalek cost them €150,000.

He regularly represented the Egypt national under-20 football team.

References

1987 births
Living people
Egyptian footballers
Zamalek SC players
Egyptian Premier League players
Association football forwards
21st-century Egyptian people